Berkeley House may refer to:
 Berkeley House, London, a classical mansion in London that was destroyed by fire in 1733 and replaced by Devonshire House
 Berkeley House, York, Upper Canada, a large home occupied by two Clerks of the Executive Council
 Berkeley House is an alternate name for the Whitehall Museum House, in Rhode Island, which is on the USA's National Register of Historic Places

See also
 Berkeley (disambiguation)